Carasobarbus, the himris, is a small genus of ray-finned fishes in the family Cyprinidae. Its species are found in rivers, streams, lakes and ponds in Western Asia and Northwest Africa. C. canis can reach  in total length, but most other species are up to around half or one-quarter of that size.

Like many other "barbs", it was long included in Barbus. It appears to be a fairly close relative of the typical barbels and relatives – the genus Barbus proper –, but closer still to the large hexaploid species nowadays separated in Labeobarbus. Because of the improved phylogenetic knowledge which indicates Barbus was highly paraphyletic in its wide circumscription –, Carasobarbus and some other closely related "barbs" (e.g. "Barbus" reinii) may be included in Labeobarbus to avoid a profusion of very small genera.

Species

Carasobarbus contains the 10 species:

 Carasobarbus apoensis (Banister & M. A. Clarke, 1977) (Arabian himri)
 Carasobarbus canis (Valenciennes, 1842) (Jordan himri)
 Carasobarbus chantrei (Sauvage, 1882) (Orontes himri)
 Carasobarbus exulatus (Banister & M. A. Clarke, 1977) (Hadramaut himri)
 Carasobarbus fritschii Günther, 1874
 Carasobarbus harterti Günther, 1901
 Carasobarbus kosswigi Ladiges, 1960 (Kisslip himri)
 Carasobarbus luteus (Heckel, 1843) (Mesopotamian himri)
 Carasobarbus moulouyensis (Pellegrin, 1924)
 Carasobarbus sublimus Coad & Najafpour, 1997

Footnotes

References
  (2007): Evolutionary origin of Lake Tana's (Ethiopia) small Barbus species: indications of rapid ecological divergence and speciation. Anim. Biol. 57(1): 39–48.  (HTML abstract)

 
 
Cyprinid fish of Asia
Cyprinidae genera